Holy Family Catholic Church is a Roman Catholic church located at Maulana Azad Road, Srinagar, Jammu and Kashmir, India. It was established in 1896 by Msgr. Winkley MHM. Before the Curia moved to Jammu on 23 December 1986, the parish served as a cathedral when the Curia was in Srinagar. Holy Family Catholic Church and All Saints Protestant Church are the two main churches for the minority Christian community in the city.

Arson and reconstruction 
The church was set on fire on 7 June 1967 by protestors demonstrating against the Arab-Israeli war. During the arson, the belfry was destroyed. The church was rebuilt, and in 2017 a new church bell, which was donated by a Kashmiri Indian Christian family and made in the Indian city of Moradabad, was installed at Holy Family Catholic Church. This occurred in an interfaith service, in which Christian, Muslim, Hindu and Sikh clergymen assembled “to jointly ring the new bell for the first time in the past 50 years”.

See also

 List of Catholic churches in India
St. Joseph's Catholic Church (Baramulla)

References

External links
Church bell rings in Kashmir church after 5 decades - Daijiworld Media

1896 establishments in India
Roman Catholic churches completed in 1896
Roman Catholic churches in Jammu and Kashmir
Churches in Srinagar
19th-century Roman Catholic church buildings in India
Interfaith dialogue
Attacks on churches in Asia
Churches destroyed by arson